La figliastra: Storia di corna e di passioni is a 1976 commedia sexy all'italiana film directed by Edoardo Mulargia. It features Bruno Scipioni with Austrian sexploitation star Sonja Jeannine (credited as Sonia Jeanine).

In France, the film was released in an adult version with added hardcore scenes and under the title Veuves excitées.

Plot
The wife of the Sicilian barone Francesco 'Cocò' Laganà (Bruno Scipioni) dies of heart failure while having sex with the lecherous gardener Fefè (Nino Terzo). Cocò marries a Northerner widow named Nadia (Maristella Greco), her beautiful teenage daughter Daniela (Sonja Jeannine) later moving to her stepfather's house. Both Cocò and Fefè (who is now married to Cocò's nymphomaniac sister Agata (Lucrezia Love)) make sexual advances to Daniela but to no avail. Meanwhile Cocò's heirship to a large inheritance is in jeopardy because his late wife did not beget him a child and Nadia cannot get pregnant, the Sicilian customary law barring a man without offspring from heirship.

References

External links

1976 films
Commedia sexy all'italiana
1970s Italian-language films
1970s sex comedy films
Films set in Sicily
Films directed by Edoardo Mulargia
1976 comedy films
1970s Italian films